Guijuelo is a municipality located in the province of Salamanca, Castile and León, Spain. As of 2016 the municipality has a population of 5630 inhabitants.

See also

CD Guijuelo, the football club of this municipality.

References

Municipalities in the Province of Salamanca